A list of films produced in Brazil in 1930:

See also
 1930 in Brazil

External links
Brazilian films of 1930 at the Internet Movie Database

Brazil
1930
Films